Jerome Loving is an American literary critic and academic. He is Distinguished Professor Emeritus of American Literature and Culture at Texas A&M University at College Station, and the author of several books about Walt Whitman, Theodore Dreiser, Mark Twain and Emily Dickinson. His Jack and Norman: A State-raised Convict and the Legacy of Norman Mailer’s The Executioner’s Song is under option by Village Roadshow Entertainment Group. He served as a Fulbright Professor in Leningrad in 1978 and Paris in 1989–90. He also taught at the Sorbonne in 1984 and at the University of Texas at Austin in 1986. His biography of Walt Whitman was a finalist for the Los Angeles Book Prize in 2000. He was awarded a Guggenheim Fellowship for his scholarly contributions to American Literature in 2002.

References

Living people
Pennsylvania State University alumni
Duquesne University alumni
Duke University alumni
University of Texas at Austin faculty
Year of birth missing (living people)